Donald Woan (7 November 1927 – 24 April 2020) was an English footballer who played as a right winger.

References

1927 births
2020 deaths
Association football wingers
English footballers
Liverpool F.C. players
Leyton Orient F.C. players
Bradford City A.F.C. players
Tranmere Rovers F.C. players
Yeovil Town F.C. players
Bootle F.C. players
English Football League players
People from Bootle